Bahrdorf is a municipality in the district of Helmstedt, in Lower Saxony, Germany.

The municipality consists of four villages:

 Bahrdorf (including Blanken)
 Mackendorf (including Klinkerwerk)
 Rickensdorf
 Saalsdorf (including Altena, a manor house)

Famous citizens
 Albert of Saxony, philosopher and bishop

References

Helmstedt (district)